Shaun Thompson (born 13 July 1987 in Slough) is a British ice hockey player who currently plays for the Braehead Clan of the Elite Ice Hockey League.

Thompson joined Basingstoke Bison in 2003.  In 2005 and 2006, he was sent to the Bracknell Bees in the English Premier Ice Hockey League in aid of his development.  In 2007, he briefly played for the Nottingham Panthers before returning to Bracknell and once again Basingstoke for the 2008-09 Elite League season.

External links

1987 births
Basingstoke Bison players
Bracknell Bees players
English ice hockey forwards
Living people
Nottingham Panthers players
Sportspeople from Slough